is the compilation album by Japanese singer-songwriter Tatsuro Yamashita, released in November 1995.

Background
Treasures consists mostly of his singles released under Moon Records, Yamashita's own label which was established after completing his contract with RCA Records. At first, he was supposed to release the studio album entitled Dreaming Boy in autumn 1995. However, recording of the album ran aground, and the project itself was eventually postponed over the years. The artist decided to release "greatest hits" album instead, responding to the order of alternative release from the distributor EastWest Japan.

Treasures was the first compilation album spanning his post-RCA materials. The album features his only chart-topping million-seller "Christmas Eve", and also includes other smash hit singles like "Get Back in Love", "Endless Game", and "Sayonara Natsu no Hi". The running order of the compilation was finally determined by his spouse Mariya Takeuchi. On the closing number for the album, Yamashita picked out one of his most early efforts called "Parade". It was originally included on the album Niagara Triangle Vol.1 issued in 1976, the project recorded by the supergroup composed of Yamashita, Ginji Itō and Eiichi Ohtaki. The song (newly remixed by Ohtaki) became a minor hit 17 years after the first release, featured on the children's program Ponkickies and released as a solo single by Yamashita. Because it gained attention moderately at the time, he added the song as the bonus track to this compilation.

Reception
Treasures debuted at the number-one on the Japanese Oricon chart and remained there for 16 weeks, with estimated sales of over 1.1 million copies. In December 1995, the album was certified Triple Platinum by the Recording Industry Association of Japan, for shipments of over 1.2 million units. It has been his best-selling album to date. Digitally remastered edition was reissued in June 1999, distributed by Warner Music Japan.

Track listing
All songs written, composed, arranged and produced by Tatsuro Yamashita
"" – 4:22
"" – 4:31
"Get Back in Love" [Album Version] – 4:22
"" – 4:00
"" – 4:28
"Endless Game" – 4:11
"" [Remix] – 4:51
" -Turner's Steamroller-" [Single Version] – 4:34
"" [Remix] – 3:15
"Jungle Swing" – 5:05
"" [Remix] – 5:08
" (Homage to "Angel Baby")" [Remix] – 2:45
"Christmas Eve" – 4:15
"" – 4:38
"" [Remix] – 6:07
"Parade" [Remix] – 4:00

Charts

Weekly charts

Year-end charts

Certifications

Release history

References

Tatsuro Yamashita albums
1995 greatest hits albums